The 2001 NCAA Skiing Championships were contested at the Middlebury College Snow Bowl in Hancock, Vermont as part of the  48th annual NCAA-sanctioned ski tournament to determine the individual and team national champions of men's and women's collegiate slalom and cross-country skiing in the United States.

Defending champions Denver, coached by Kurt Smitz, won the team championship, the Pioneers' second co-ed title and sixteenth overall.

Venue

This year's championships were contested at the Middlebury College Snow Bowl in Hancock, Vermont. Middlebury College served as hosts.

These were the ninth championships held in the state of Vermont.

Program

Men's events
 Cross country, 20 kilometer freestyle
 Cross country, 10 kilometer classical
 Slalom
 Giant slalom

Women's events
 Cross country, 15 kilometer freestyle
 Cross country, 5 kilometer classical
 Slalom
 Giant slalom

Team scoring

 DC – Defending champions
 Debut team appearance

See also
 List of NCAA skiing programs

References

2001 in sports in Vermont
NCAA Skiing Championships
NCAA Skiing Championships
2001 in alpine skiing
2001 in cross-country skiing